Campobello Island Consolidated School is a K-12 school located on Campobello Island in Charlotte County, New Brunswick. Campobello Island Consolidated School is in the Anglophone South School District.

See also
 List of schools in New Brunswick
 Anglophone South School District

References

Schools in Charlotte County, New Brunswick
High schools in New Brunswick
Elementary schools in New Brunswick
Middle schools in New Brunswick